The 1976 All-Ireland Senior Football Championship was the 90th staging of the All-Ireland Senior Football Championship, the Gaelic Athletic Association's premier inter-county Gaelic football tournament. The championship began on 9 May 1976 and ended on 26 September 1976.

Kerry were the defending champions.

On 26 September 1976, Dublin won the championship following a 3-8 to 0-10 defeat of Kerry in the All-Ireland final. This was their 19th All-Ireland title, their first in two championship seasons.

Dublin's Jimmy Keaveney was the choice for Texaco Footballer of the Year.

Results

Connacht Senior Football Championship

Quarter-finals

Semi-finals

Finals

Leinster Senior Football Championship

First round

Quarter-finals

Semi-finals

 

Final

Munster Senior Football Championship

Quarter-finals

 

Semi-finals

 

Finals

Ulster Senior Football Championship

Preliminary round

Quarter-finals

 
  
 

Semi-finals

Finals

All-Ireland Senior Football Championship

Semi-finals

Final

Championship statistics

Miscellaneous

 Leitrim recorded their first win over Mayo since 1959 after a replay.
 Cork Athletic Grounds changed its name to Pairc Ui Chaoimh after Pádraig Ó Caoimh.
 3 Provincial finals end in a draw and to a replay in the same year for the first time since 1924 (CLU) and never since (as of 2019) Connacht, Munster and Ulster. 1888, 1903 & 1915 were the only other years up to 1976 to have had multiple provincial final draws.
 The All-Ireland final was Dublin's first win over Kerry since the All-Ireland semi-final of 1934.

Top scorers
Overall

Single game

References

External links
 "From the archives: Preview of 1976 Ulster SFC final between Derry and Cavan". BBC Sport. 26 April 2020.